Oliver Tarney is a British sound supervisor and sound designer who is most known for his work with Ridley Scott and Paul Greengrass.

Tarney was nominated for an Academy Award for Best Sound Editing for the 2013 film Captain Phillips. He was nominated for three BAFTAs for Best Sound; in 2007 for United 93, in 2014 for Captain Phillips, and in 2021 for News of the World. 
Tarney received his second Oscar nomination for Best Sound Editing in 2016 for the film The Martian. In 2020, Tarney received his third Oscar nomination for Best Sound Editing for the film 1917. In 2022, he received his fourth Oscar nomination for Best Sound for the film No Time to Die.

References

External links

1970 births
Living people
Best Sound BAFTA Award winners
British sound editors